On 31 December 2018 at 20:52 GMT, three people were stabbed in a knife attack at Manchester Victoria station. A man and woman in their 50s and a British Transport Police officer were seriously injured. The perpetrator, Mahdi Mohamud, was originally detained under the Mental Health Act, was sentenced to life imprisonment in a high-security psychiatric hospital. Witnesses reported the he shouted "Allah" during the attack and "Allahu Akbar" after being arrested. He appears to have acted alone.

Victims
Two of the three victims, a couple who had come into town to celebrate the New Year, were hospitalised with serious injuries. The third victim was a British Transport Police officer who received a stab wound to his shoulder.

Suspect
The suspect, due to concerns over his mental health, was initially held under the Mental Health Act. He is a 25-year-old man from Somalia who has lived in England for about 10 years and resides in Manchester's Cheetham neighbourhood with his parents and siblings. On 31 May 2019, it was reported that the suspect was charged with a terrorism offence and three counts of attempted murder, and was due to appear in court. The perpetrator pleaded guilty to three counts of attempted murder and a terror offence. In November, 2019 he was sentenced to life imprisonment in a high-security psychiatric hospital.

Motivation
Police are reported as having an open mind in relation to the motives. Greater Manchester Police said that because of the nature of the attack, their officers were looking into the state of the suspect's mental health. The BBC reported that a witness alleged that during the attack he shouted "Allah" and also shouted a slogan "criticising Western governments".  BBC producer Sam Clack reported he heard him saying "As long as you keep bombing other countries this sort of s--- is going to keep happening," According to The Guardian, witnesses heard the attacker shout "Allahu Akbar" after he was arrested and "long live the caliphate".

References

2018 in England
Victoria stabbing attack
December 2018 crimes in Europe
December 2018 events in the United Kingdom
Stabbing attacks in 2018
Stabbing attacks in England
Victoria stabbing attack
Attacks during the New Year celebrations
Islamic terrorism in Manchester
Islamic terrorist incidents in 2018
Terrorist incidents in the United Kingdom in 2018